Gabriel Minvielle was a prominent Huguenot  who settled in New York after emigrating from France in 1673. He engaged in foreign trade, especially with the West Indies, and prospered as a merchant and trader and also politically, serving as the 15th Mayor of New York City from 1684 until 1685. Minvielle was later honored several times by appointment as a member of the Governor's Council. 

Minvielle was integral in the creation of the Huguenot settlement of New Rochelle, New York in 1688.

See also
 List of mayors of New York City

References

Mayors of New York City
French emigrants to the Thirteen Colonies
Huguenots
Politicians from New Rochelle, New York
Businesspeople from Bordeaux
1702 deaths
Year of birth unknown